Astarte is a genus of bivalve mollusc in the Astartidae family. It was circumscribed by James Sowerby in 1816. , WoRMS recognizes approximately 33 species in this genus.

Species include:
 Astarte acuticostata 
 Astarte arctica 
 Astarte borealis 
 Astarte castanea 
 Astarte crebricostata 
 Astarte crenata 
 Astarte elliptica 
 Astarte fusca  
 Astarte montagui 
 Astarte subaequilatera 
 Astarte sulcata 
 Astarte undata 

Approximately nine of its species can be found in the waters of Europe.

References

Astartidae
Marine molluscs of Europe
Bivalve genera
 Bivalves of Europe